James W. Parkinson (September 10, 1829January 28, 1897) was an American farmer, politician, and Wisconsin pioneer.  He served one term in the Wisconsin State Assembly, representing Calumet County during the 1880 session.

Biography
James W. Parkinson was born in Jefferson County, New York, in September 1829.  He received a common school education and moved to Wisconsin in 1855.  He stayed briefly in Shebyogan, before settling at Brothertown, in Calumet County, in 1856.

He served as town clerk and superintendent of the local schools, and was justice of the peace for 26 years.  He served as chairman of the town board for 23 years, and was chairman of the Calumet County board of supervisors for the last 20 years of his life.

In 1892, he was elected to another term in the Assembly, and served in the 1893–1894 session.

He died at his home in Brothertown, in January 1897.

Electoral history

Wisconsin Assembly (1879)

| colspan="6" style="text-align:center;background-color: #e9e9e9;"| General Election, November 4, 1879

Wisconsin Assembly (1892)

| colspan="6" style="text-align:center;background-color: #e9e9e9;"| General Election, November 8, 1892

References

External links
 

1829 births
1897 deaths
People from Jefferson County, New York
People from Brothertown, Wisconsin
Farmers from Wisconsin
County supervisors in Wisconsin
Democratic Party members of the Wisconsin State Assembly
19th-century American politicians